Major General Cleland Cofie Bruce was a Ghanaian military personnel and a former Chief of Army Staff of the Ghana Army. He served as Chief of Army Staff from August 1966 – May 1967.

References

Ghanaian military personnel
Chiefs of Army Staff (Ghana)